Matheus Monteiro do Nascimento (born 1 March 2000) is a Brazilian professional footballer who plays for São José RS.

References

External links 
 
 Player's profile at pressball.by

2000 births
Living people
Brazilian footballers
Footballers from São Paulo
Association football forwards
Brazilian expatriate footballers
Expatriate footballers in Belarus
Brazilian expatriate sportspeople in Belarus
Sport Club Internacional players
FC Torpedo-BelAZ Zhodino players
Esporte Clube São José players